Igor Stravinsky was a Russian composer, pianist, and conductor known for being one of the most important and influential figures in twentieth-century classical music. His unique approach to rhythm, instrumentation, and tonality made him a pivotal figure in modernist music.

Stravinsky studied composition under composer Nikolai Rimsky-Korsakov from 1902 to 1908, Stravinsky's Feu d'artifice being his last piece composed under Rimsky-Korsakov. During this time, Stravinsky completed his first full composition, the Symphony in E-flat major, catalogued Op. 1. Attending the premiere of Stravinsky's Scherzo fantastique and Feu d'artifice in 1909 was the Russian impresario Sergei Diaghilev, owner of the Ballets Russes ballet company. Diaghilev was impressed enough that he commissioned Stravinsky to write some arrangements for the 1909 ballet season. In the following years, Diaghilev commissioned Stravinsky to write three ballets: The Firebird (1910), Petrushka (1911), and The Rite of Spring (1913). These ballets remain Stravinsky's most famous works today.

Stravinsky's music is typically divided into three style periods: the Russian period (c. 1907-1919), the neoclassical period (c. 1920-1954), and the serial period (1954-1968). Stravinsky's Russian period is characterized by the use of Russian folk tunes and the influence of Rimsky-Korsakov, Tchaikovsky, Glazunov, and Taneyev. His neoclassical period reflected back to the techniques and themes of the Classical period, like his use of the sonata form in the first movement of his Octet (1923) and the Greek mythological themes in Apollo (1928), Perséphone (1933), and Orpheus (1947). His serial period began with using Schoenberg's twelve-tone technique dodecaphony in Agon (1954-57), later experimenting with non-twelve-tone techniques in his Cantata (1952) and Septet (1953).

List organization 
This list is sorted by numbers assigned to Stravinsky's works in Helmut Kirchmeyer's K Catalog. The Kirchmeyer-Verzeichnis (shortened as "K") Catalog is an annotated catalog of works by Stravinsky, started in the 1950s originally placed in appendixes of other works about Stravinsky. The first edition of the catalog was published in 2002. The Kirchmayer catalogue and Köchel catalogue of W.A. Mozart's works both use "K" as an abbreviation; the difference is that Köchel uses a K followed by a period then space (e.g. K. 492) while Kirchmeyer uses no period and no space (e.g. K013). Additionally, works marked with "KN" (e.g. KN01) were added after the publishing of the first edition. The opus numbers are according to what Stravinsky marked on the music. The works are named according the K Catalog. Other sources may have different titles due to Cyrillic romanization conventions.

This list contains the following information in column order from left to right: K Catalog number, opus number, name of the composition, year the composition was finished, genre, notes, and references.

Compositions by Igor Stravinsky

By type of composition

Opera/theatre
The Nightingale (Le Rossignol), 3-act opera (1914)
Renard, a burlesque for 4 pantomimes and chamber orchestra (1916)
L'Histoire du soldat (The Soldier's Tale), for chamber ensemble and three speakers (1918)
Mavra, one-act opera (1922)
Oedipus rex, 2-act opera-oratorio (1927)
Perséphone, mélodrame for speaker, soloists, chorus and orchestra (1933)
The Rake's Progress, 3-act opera (1951)
The Flood, television opera (1962)

Ballet
The Firebird (L'oiseau de feu) (1910; rev. 1919, 1945)
Petrushka (1911, rev. 1947)
The Rite of Spring (Le sacre du printemps) (1913; rev. 1947, 1967)
Les Noces (The Wedding), for soloists, choir, four pianos and percussion (1914–17 and 1919–23)
Pulcinella, for chamber orchestra and soloists (1920)
Apollo (Apollon musagète), for string orchestra (1928; rev. 1947)
Le Baiser de la fée (The Fairy's Kiss) (1928; rev. 1950)
Jeu de cartes (Card Game) (1936)
Circus Polka (1942)
Scènes de ballet (1944)
Orpheus, for chamber orchestra (1947)
Agon (1957)

Orchestral
Symphony in E-flat major, Op. 1 (1907)
Scherzo fantastique, Op. 3 (1908)
Feu d'artifice (Fireworks), Op. 4 (1908)
 Funeral Song (Погребальная песня; Chant funèbre), Op. 5 (1908); composed to commemorate the death of Nikolai Rimsky-Korsakov; premiered 17 January 1909 in the Grand Hall of the Saint Petersburg Conservatory; lost until September 2015.
Le chant du rossignol (Song of the Nightingale) (1917)
Suite from Pulcinella (1920; rev. 1947)
Suite No. 2 for chamber orchestra (1921, arrangement of Trois pièces faciles and Cinq pièces faciles No. 5)
Suite No. 1 for chamber orchestra (1925, arrangement of Cinq pièces faciles Nos. 1–4)
Quatre études, for orchestra (1928, arrangement of Three Pieces for String Quartet and Étude pour pianola)
Divertimento (Suite from Le Baiser de la fée, 1934)
Concerto in E-flat Dumbarton Oaks, for chamber orchestra (1938)
Symphony in C (1940)
Danses concertantes for chamber orchestra (1941–42)
Four Norwegian Moods (1942)
Ode (1943)
Scherzo à la russe for orchestra (1944, also a version for Paul Whiteman's band)
Circus Polka (1944)
Symphony in Three Movements (1945)
Concerto in D "Basle", for string orchestra (1946)
Tango for chamber orchestra (1953, arrangement of 1940 work for piano)
Greeting Prelude for orchestra (1955), for the 80th birthday of Pierre Monteux
8 Instrumental Miniatures for 15 Players (1963, orchestration of Les cinq doigts)
Variations (Aldous Huxley in Memoriam) (1963/1964)
Canon on a Popular Russian Tune (1965)

Concertante
Concerto for Piano and Wind Instruments (1923–24, rev. 1950)
Capriccio for Piano and Orchestra (1929/1949)
Violin Concerto in D (1931)
Movements for Piano and Orchestra (1958/1959)

Choral
Cantata for Rimsky-Korsakov's Sixtieth Birthday, for chorus and piano (1904). Unpublished. Performed once on 19 March 1904 at Nikolai Rimsky-Korsakov's apartment in St. Petersburg and subsequently lost.
Zvezdoliki (Le roi des étoiles) (The King of the Stars), for men's choir and orchestra (1912)
Four Russian Peasant Songs, for female voice unaccompanied (1917)
Pater Noster (Otche Nash) for chorus a cappella (1926, rev. 1949)
Symphony of Psalms, for chorus and orchestra (1930, rev. 1948)
Credo (Veruyu) for chorus a cappella (1932, rev. 1964)
Ave Maria (Bogoroditse Dyevo) for chorus a cappella (1934, rev. 1949)
Babel (1944)
 Mass, for chorus and double wind quintet (1944–48)
 Cantata, for mezzo-soprano, tenor, female chorus, 2 flutes, oboe, English horn, and cello (1951–52)
Canticum Sacrum, for tenor, baritone, chorus, and orchestra (1955)
Threni, for six soloists, chorus, and orchestra (1958)
A Sermon, a Narrative and a Prayer for alto, tenor, speaker, chorus, and orchestra (1961)
Anthem (The dove descending breaks the air), for chorus a cappella (1962)
Introitus, for men's chorus and chamber ensemble (1965)
Requiem Canticles, for bass, contralto, chorus, and orchestra (1966)

Vocal
Le Nuage (Туча; Storm-Cloud), for voice and piano (1902)
The Mushrooms Going to War, for voice (bass) and piano (1904)
Conductor and Tarantula, for voice and piano (1906) Lost.
Faun and Shepherdess, for mezzo-soprano and orchestra, Op. 2 (1907)
Pastorale, for vocalise soprano and piano (1907)
Stravinsky created an arrangement of this piece for soprano and four woodwinds in 1923, and arrangements for violin and piano and for violin and four woodwinds in 1933.
Two Melodies of Gorodestsky, for mezzo-soprano and piano, Op. 6 (1908)
Deux poèmes de Paul Verlaine, for baritone and piano, Op. 9 (1910, arranged for baritone and orchestra 1951)
Two Poems of K. Balmont, for voice and piano (1911, arranged for voice and small orchestra 1954)
Three Japanese Lyrics (Trois poésies de la lyrique japonaise), for voice and piano or chamber orchestra (1913)
Trois petites chansons, for voice and piano (1906–1913, arranged for voice and small orchestra 1930)
Pribaoutki, for voice, four woodwinds, and four strings (1914)
Kornílo (Uncle Kornilo)
Natashka (Little Natalie)
Polkovnik (The Colonel)
Starets i zayats (The Old Man and the Hare)
Berceuses du chat, for contralto and three clarinets (1916)
Three Tales for Children, for voice and piano (1917)
Tilim-bom
Geese, Swans
The bear's little song
Berceuse, for voice and piano (1918)
Quatre chants russes, for voice and piano (1918–19)
Selezen’ (The Drake)
Zapevnaya (Counting Song)
Sidit varabey na chuzhoy garadbe (Dish-divination Song)
Sektanskaya (Song of the Sectarian)
Petit ramusianum harmonique, for single voice or voices (1938)
Three Songs from William Shakespeare, for mezzo-soprano, flute, clarinet, and viola (1953)
Four Songs, for mezzo-soprano, flute, harp and guitar (1954, arrangement of Quatre chants russes Nos. 1 & 4; Three Tales for Children Nos. 1 & 2)
In Memoriam Dylan Thomas (Dirge-canons and song), for tenor, string quartet, and four trombones (1954)
Abraham and Isaac, a sacred ballad for baritone and orchestra (1963)
Elegy for J.F.K., for baritone or mezzo-soprano and three clarinets (1964)
The Owl and the Pussy Cat, for soprano and piano (1966)

Chamber
Three Pieces for String Quartet (1914)
Pour Pablo Picasso, for solo clarinet (1917) Unpublished.
Canon for Two Horns (1917) Unpublished.
Ragtime for Eleven Instruments (1917–18)
Lied ohne Name (Duet for Two Bassoons) (1918)
Suite from L'Histoire du soldat, for violin, clarinet, and piano (1919)
Three Pieces for Clarinet (1919)
Concertino, for string quartet (1920)
Symphonies of Wind Instruments (1920, rev. 1947)
Octet for Wind Instruments (1923)
Suite on themes, fragments and pieces by Giambattista Pergolesi, for violin and piano (1925)
Duo Concertant for Violin and Piano (1932)
Suite italienne (from Pulcinella), for cello and piano (1932/33) (in collaboration with Gregor Piatigorsky)
Suite italienne (from Pulcinella), for violin and piano (1934) (in collaboration with Samuel Dushkin)
Preludium for Jazz Band (1936/37)
Elegy, for solo viola (1944)
Ebony Concerto for clarinet and jazz band (1945)
Septet for clarinet, horn, bassoon, violin, viola, cello, and piano (1953)
Concertino, for small ensemble (1953) (arrangement of 1920 work for string quartet)
Epitaphium, for flute, clarinet and harp (1959)
Double Canon, for string quartet 'Raoul Dufy in Memoriam' (1959)
Monumentum pro Gesualdo di Venosa ad CD annum, for chamber ensemble (1960)
"Asciugate I begli ochi"
"Ma tu, cagion di quella"
"Belta poi che t'assenti"
Lullaby, for two recorders (1960) (arrangement of item from The Rake's Progress, 1951)
Fanfare for a New Theatre, for two trumpets (1964)

Piano
Tarantella (1898) Unpublished.
Storm-Cloud (Le Nuage) (1898) Lost.
Scherzo (1902)
Piano Sonata in F-sharp minor (1904)
Quatre études, Op. 7 (1908)
The Firebird (L'oiseau de feu) (1910)
Petrushka, reduction for piano duet (1912, rev. 1947)
The Rite of Spring (Le sacre du printemps), for four hands on one piano (1913)
Valse des fleurs, for two pianos (1914)
Polka, for piano solo (1915)
Valse, for piano solo (1915)
Trois pièces faciles, for four hands (1915)
Souvenir d’une marche boche (1915)
Cinq pièces faciles, for four hands (1917)
Valse pour les enfants (1917)
Piano-Rag-Music (1919)
Fragment des symphonies pour instruments à vent à la mémoire de Achille-Claude Debussy (1920)
Chorale (1920)
Les cinq doigts (1921)
Trois mouvements de Petrouchka (1921)
Piano Sonata (1924)
Serenade in A (1925)
Le chant du rossignol, arrangement for piano (1927)
Apollon musagète (1927), transcribed for the piano by the author from the version for string orchestra completed in January 1928
Concerto for Two Pianos (1935)
Tango (1940)
Circus Polka (1942)
Sonata for Two Pianos (1943)
Scherzo à la russe, arrangement for two pianos (1944)
Agon, reduction for two pianos by the composer (1957)
Two Sketches for a Sonata (1967)

Player piano
This is not a list of all piano rolls of Stravinsky's music, but only of those the composer himself composed or re-wrote for player piano. The dates are of publication.
Étude pour pianola (Study for Pianola) – Aeolian Company, London, Themodist T967 (1921)
Pulcinella Pleyel, Paris, Pleyela 8421 – 8428 (1921)
The Rite of Spring (Le sacre du printemps) – Pleyel, Paris, Pleyela 8429 – 8437 (1921)
The Rite of Spring (Le sacre du printemps) – Aeolian Company, London, Themodist T24150 – T24153 (1921)
Piano-Rag-Music – Pleyel, Paris, Pleyela 8438 (1921)
Ragtime – Pleyel, Paris, Pleyela 8450 (1921)
Petrushka – Pleyel, Paris, Pleyela 8441 – 8447 (1922)
Le chant du rossignol (Song of the Nightingale) – Pleyel, Paris, Pleyela 8451 – 8453 (1922/3)
Three Tales for Children – Pleyel, Paris, Pleyela 8454 (1922/3)
Quatre chants russes (Four Russian Songs) – Pleyel, Paris, Pleyela 8455 (1922/3)
Concertino – Pleyel, Paris, Pleyela 8456 (1923)
Les Noces (The Wedding) – Pleyel, Paris 8831 – 8834, 8861 (1923)
The Firebird (L'oiseau de feu) – Pleyel, Paris, Pleyela 10039 – 10045 (1926)
The Firebird (L'oiseau de feu) – Aeolian Company, London, Duo-Art D759 – D769 (1929)

Arrangements and transcriptions
Les Sylphides (After Chopin) (1909)
Song of the Volga Boatmen (1917)
Chorus from the Prologue to 'Boris Godunov''' (1918)Marseillaise (1919) for solo violinThe Star-Spangled Banner (1941)Bluebird Pas de Deux, from Pyotr Ilyich Tchaikovsky (1941)
 Canzonetta Jean Sibelius (1963)
 Two Sacred Songs from Hugo Wolf's Spanisches Liederbuch (1968)
 Four Preludes and Fugues from Bach's The Well-Tempered Clavier (1969)

Ballets to the music of StravinskyDanses concertantesThe Cage (1951) to the Concerto in DOctet (1958) to the OctetMonumentum pro Gesualdo (1960) to the Monumentum pro Gesualdo di Venosa ad CD annumArcade (1963) to the Concerto for Piano and Wind InstrumentsRequiem Canticles (Robbins) (1966) to the Requiem CanticlesVariations (1966) to the VariationsRequiem Canticles (Balanchine) (1968) to the Requiem CanticlesOde (1972) to the OdeScènes de ballet (1972) to the Scènes de balletSymphony in E-flat (1972) to the Symphony in E-flatSymphony in Three Movements (1972) to the Symphony in Three MovementsÉlégie (1982) to the Élégie for solo violaNoah and the Flood (1982) to The FloodTango (Balanchine) (1982) to the TangoTango (Martins) (1984) to the TangoScènes de ballet (1999) to the Scènes de ballet''

References

Sources

External links
List of works at the Igor Stravinsky Foundation
K Catalog: Annotated Catalog of Works and Work Editions of Igor Strawinsky till 1971

 
Stravinsky, Igor